Éditions L'Harmattan, usually known simply as L'Harmattan, is one of the largest French book publishers. It specialises in non-fiction books with a particular focus on Sub-Saharan Africa. It is named after the Harmattan, a trade wind in West Africa.

Description
L'Harmattan was founded in 1975. In 2013 it produced 500 magazines and 2,000 new books per year, both in print and as e-books, and has a backlist of 38,000 books, 33,000 e-books, and 1,700 videos, with about a third each on Europe, Africa, and the rest of the world.

A third of its titles are in literature, a tenth in history, and 5 per cent each in philosophy, current affairs, education, politics, sociology, and fine arts. Slightly fewer are published in economics, psychology, ethnology, languages, etc., but even these categories have hundreds of titles, for example 500 in languages,
and more languages taught than almost any other publisher.

L'Harmattan controls costs by requiring authors to prepare electronic manuscripts in final format, not paying royalties on the first few hundred copies, and having short print runs of only a few hundred for its most specialized books.

It has sales of 8.5 million euros per year, of which 2 million are exported.

Book series
In 2021, L'Harmattan was publishing 1,300 "collections" (book series), including the following:
 "Afrique au cœur des lettres" (series editor: Jean-Pierre Orban)
 "Éducateurs et Préventions" (series editor: Pascal Le Rest)
 "Parlons..." (series editor: Michel Malherbe) - a series of language and culture learning books
 "Poètes des cinq continents" (series editor: Philippe Tancelin)
 "Questions alimentaires et gastronomiques" (series editor: Kilien Stengel)
 "Questions autochtones" (series editors: Simone Dreyfus-Gamelon, Patrick Kulesza et Joëlle Chassin)
 "Questions contemporaines" (series editor: Bruno Péquignot)
 "Questions sociologiques" (series editors: François Hainard et Franz Schultheis)
 "Univers musical" (series editor: Anne-Marie Green)

See also

Éditions Karthala
James Currey - a defunct English publisher, specialising in sub-Saharan Africa
Academic publishing
Electronic publishing
Language education
List of language self-study programs
List of publishers of children's books
Periodical literature
Publishing

References

External links

Academic publishing companies
Book publishing companies of France
Language education publishing companies
Magazine publishing companies of France